A Rare Conundrum is the 11th album by Scottish folk musician Bert Jansch, released in 1977 in the UK. The album was first released by Ex Libris in Denmark in late 1976 as Poormouth with an alternative cover and a slightly different track list.

Track listing Original LP
All tracks composed by Bert Jansch; except where indicated

"Daybreak"
"One To A Hundred"
"Pretty Saro" (Traditional; arranged by Bert Jansch)
"Doctor, Doctor"
"3 A.M."
"The Curragh of Kildare" (Traditional; arranged by Bert Jansch)
"Instrumentally Irish" (Traditional; arranged by Bert Jansch and Rod Clements)
"St. Fiacre"
"If You See My Love"
"Looking For A home"
"Poor Mouth"
"Cat And Mouse"
"Three Chord Trick"
"Lost Love"

Poormouth track list (Danish release)
Tracks with a star(*) don't appear on the original LP release

"Poor Mouth"
"St. Fiacre Revenge"
"Dragonfly" (John Bidwell) (*)
"Pretty Saro"
"Doctor, Doctor"
"Lost Love"
"Candy Man" (Traditional; arranged by Bert Jansch) (*)
"Daybreak"
"One to a Hundred"
"Three Dreamers" (*)
"Per's Hose Pipe" (re-titled "Instrumentally Irish") (Traditional; arranged by Bert Jansch and Rod Clements)
"The Curragh Of Kildare" (Traditional; arranged by Bert Jansch)
"If You See My Love"
"Three Chord Trick"

2009 Remaster
Same as the original LP release, with the following bonus tracks:

"Three Dreamers"
"Dragonfly" (John Bidwell)
"Candyman" (Traditional; arranged by Bert Jansch)

Personnel
Bert Jansch – vocals, guitars
Rod Clements – bass, mandolin, guitar, vocals
Ralph McTell – harmonica
'Mantha – backing vocals on "Three Card Trick"
Mike Piggott – violin
Pick Withers – drums, percussion
Dave Bainbridge - Fender Rhodes on "If You See My Love"; backing vocals on "Three Card Trick"
Technical
Rod Clements - executive producer
Peter Henderson, Colin Fairley, Jean-Louis Proust, Lindsay Kidd, Aldo Bocca - engineer
Mike Hedges - tape op
Frank Sansom - art direction
Nick Hockley - illustration

References

Bert Jansch albums
1977 albums
Charisma Records albums